Viscount Valentia is a title in the Peerage of Ireland. It has been created twice. The first creation came in 1621 for Henry Power. A year later, his kinsman Sir Francis Annesley, 1st Baronet, was given a "reversionary grant" of the viscountcy, which stated that on Power's death Annesley would be created Viscount Valentia. Annesley, a member of an influential Anglo-Irish family which descended from Newport Pagnell in the County of Buckinghamshire, was a favourite of James I, who granted him land in Ireland, notably the fort of Mountnorris in County Armagh. He was knighted in 1616, created a baronet, of Newport Pagnell in the County of Buckingham, in the Baronetage of Ireland in 1620 and Baron Mountnorris, of Mountnorris in the County of Armagh, in 1628.

In 1642, on the death of Power, he became Viscount Valentia according to the reversionary grant given in 1622. Valentia's fourth son Hon. Francis Annesley was the father of William, 1st Viscount Glerawly, from whom the Earls Annesley descend. Valentia's eldest son and successor, Arthur, the second Viscount, was created Baron Annesley, of Newport Pagnel in the County of Buckingham, and Earl of Anglesey, in Wales, in the Peerage of England, in 1661. Anglesey's younger son Altham Annesley was created Baron Altham in the Peerage of Ireland on 14 February 1681.

On the death of the fifth Earl of Anglesey in 1737 the line of the eldest son of the first Earl failed. He was succeeded by his kinsman Richard Annesley, who became the sixth Earl and seventh Viscount Valentia. However, after his assumption of the Earldom an extraordinary legal battle developed. A Mr James Annesley claimed the earldom and its subsidiary titles as the son of Arthur Annesley, fourth Baron Altham. He alleged that in 1728 he had been removed to an obscure school and that his death had subsequently been announced by his uncle, Richard, the sixth Earl of Anglesey. James was later to have been sold to an American planter as a slave by his uncle. He subsequently escaped to Jamaica and in September 1740 he made his way back to England.

On 11 November 1743 he took action against his uncle, to eject him as Baron Altham and to retain his property. Richard's defence was that James was not the legitimate son of Mary, second wife of the fourth Baron Altham, but actually the illegitimate son of a Joan Landy. The verdict was in James' favour, with his uncle being convicted of claiming he was dead and selling him into slavery so that he could take up the title and estates. James' estates were returned to him but he never took up his titles before his death in 1760 and his uncle continued to be recognised as Earl until he died in 1761.
 
In 1761, on the death of the sixth Earl, the story took a new twist. His son and heir, Arthur, assumed the titles as the "seventh Earl of Anglesey". However, Arthur's legitimacy was disputed and on 22 April 1771 the British House of Lords decided that his claim to the English titles of Baron Annesley and Earl of Anglesey were invalid and that they had become extinct upon his father's death. However, his claims to the Baronetcy of Newport-Pagnell, the Baronies of Mountnorris and Altham and the Viscountcy of Valentia were twice confirmed by the Irish House of Lords. In 1793 he was compensated when he was created Earl of Mountnorris in the Peerage of Ireland. On the death of his son, the 2nd  Earl, the earldom and barony of Altham became extinct, while he was succeeded in the baronetcy, barony of Mountnorris and viscountcy of Valentia by his distant relatives, Arthur Annesley, who became the 10th Viscount Valentia. He was fifth in descent from the Honourable Francis Annesley, fourth son of the 1st Viscount.

The 11th Viscount, was created Baron Annesley of Bletchington, in the County of Oxford, in the Peerage of the United Kingdom on 7 May 1917. However, this title became extinct on the death of his son, the 12th Viscount, in 1949. The Irish titles were inherited by his distant relative Reverend William Monckton Annesley, who became the 13th Viscount Valentia. He was also a descendant of Hon. Francis Annesley, fourth son of the first Viscount. He was succeeded by his cousin Francis Dighton Annesley, who established his claim to the titles in 1959 and became the 14th Viscount Valentia. He was the son of George Dighton Annesley, uncle of the 13th Viscount.

On the 14th Viscount's death in 1983 the titles passed to his son, Richard John Dighton Annesley. He was a Captain in the British Army, then farmed in Zimbabwe and returned to Britain in the early 1980s. As 2014 the title are held by his son, the 16th Viscount, who succeeded in 2005. Lord Valentia is also the Premier Baronet of Ireland.

The present Viscount has not successfully proven his succession to the baronetcy and is therefore not on the Official Roll of the Baronetage, with the baronetcy considered dormant since 2005, as of 31 December 2013.

Viscounts Valentia; First creation (1621)
Henry Power, 1st Viscount Valentia (died 1642)

Viscounts Valentia; Second creation (1622) (took effect 1642)
Francis Annesley, 1st Viscount Valentia (1583–1660)
Arthur Annesley, 1st Earl of Anglesey, 2nd Viscount Valentia (1614–1686) (created Earl of Anglesey in 1661)

Earls of Anglesey (1661)
Arthur Annesley, 1st Earl of Anglesey, 2nd Viscount Valentia (1614–1686)
James Annesley, 2nd Earl of Anglesey, 3rd Viscount Valentia (1645–1690)
James Annesley, 3rd Earl of Anglesey, 4th Viscount Valentia (1674–1702)
John Annesley, 4th Earl of Anglesey, 5th Viscount Valentia (1676–1710)
Arthur Annesley, 5th Earl of Anglesey, 6th Viscount Valentia (d. 1737)
Richard Annesley, 6th Earl of Anglesey, 7th Viscount Valentia (1690–1761)

Viscounts Valentia; reverted (1761)
Arthur Annesley, 8th Viscount Valentia (1744–1816) (created Earl of Mountnorris in 1793)

Earls of Mountnorris (1793)
Arthur Annesley, 1st Earl of Mountnorris, 8th Viscount Valentia (1744–1816)
George Annesley, 2nd Earl of Mountnorris, 9th Viscount Valentia (1770–1844)

Viscounts Valentia; Reverted (1844)
Arthur Annesley, 10th Viscount Valentia (1785–1863)
Arthur Annesley, 11th Viscount Valentia (1843–1927)
Caryl Arthur Annesley, 12th Viscount Valentia (1883–1949)
William Monckton Annesley, 13th Viscount Valentia (1875–1951) 
Francis Dighton Annesley, 14th Viscount Valentia (1888–1983)
Richard John Dighton Annesley, 15th Viscount Valentia (1929–2005)
Francis William Dighton Annesley, 16th Viscount Valentia (born 1959)

The heir presumptive is the present holder's brother Hon. Peter John Annesley (born 1967)
The heir presumptive's heir apparent is his son William Lester Dighton Annesley (born 1999).

See also
Baron Altham
Earl of Anglesey
Earl Annesley
Donald McCarthy, 1st Earl of Clancare (d.1601), whose son Teige was styled "Lord Valentia"

References

Sources

Kidd, Charles, Williamson, David (eds). Debrett's Peerage and Baronetage (1990 edition). New York: St Martin's Press, 1990.

Viscountcies in the Peerage of Ireland
Extinct viscountcies in the Peerage of Ireland
Noble titles created in 1621
Noble titles created in 1622
Viscount